Mainz-Gustavsburg station is the station of the town of Ginsheim-Gustavsburg in the German state of Hesse on the Main Railway from Mainz to Frankfurt am Main. It is classified by Deutsche Bahn as a category 5 station. The station is served by the S-Bahn and some regional trains. The station was opened at its current location in 1858.

Between 1930 and 1945, Gustavsburg was a district of the city of Mainz and, as a result, the station was renamed Mainz-Gustavsburg. In 1945, the American and French occupying authorities transferred Gustavsburg to American administration and several months later it became part of the new state of Hesse. Although Gustavsburg became a self-governing municipality again as a result, the station is still called Mainz-Gustavsburg.

Rail operations 
Gustavsburg lies in the area served by the Rhein-Main-Verkehrsverbund (Rhine-Main Transport Association, RMV). It is served by Rhine-Main S-Bahn trains operated by DB Regio. Services on line S8 operate at 30-minute intervals on the Wiesbaden Hauptbahnhof–Hanau Hauptbahnhof route.

Gustavsburg station is also served by a Regionalbahn service between Wiesbaden and Aschaffenburg. These trains call at the station only during rush hours; at other times, they pass through without stopping.

References

Rhine-Main S-Bahn stations
Railway stations in Hesse
Railway stations in Germany opened in 1858
Buildings and structures in Groß-Gerau (district)